Mirza Muraduzzaman (11 March 1939 – 18 July 1995) is a Bangladesh Nationalist Party politician and the former Member of Parliament of Sirajganj-2.

Birth and early life 
Mirza Muraduzzaman was born on 11 March 1939 in Sirajganj District.

Career 
Muraduzzaman was elected to parliament from Sirajganj-2 as a Bangladesh Nationalist Party candidate in 1991.

Death 
Mirza died on 18 July 1995.

References 

Bangladesh Nationalist Party politicians
1939 births
5th Jatiya Sangsad members
1995 deaths
People from Sirajganj District